The 2017 Colorado Rockies season was the franchise's 25th in Major League Baseball. It was the 23rd season the Rockies played their home games at Coors Field. Bud Black became the new Rockies Manager after the resignation of Walt Weiss. Black in his first season was a finalist for the Manager of the Year award. The Rockies finished the season 87–75 in third place in the National League West Division, 17 games behind the Los Angeles Dodgers. They did, however, receive the second wild card spot in the National League and advanced to the playoffs for the first time since 2009. In the Wild Card Game, they lost to the Arizona Diamondbacks.

Offseason and spring training
December 13, 2016: Ian Desmond was signed as a free agent by the Colorado Rockies.
December 15, 2016: Mike Dunn was signed as a free agent by the Colorado Rockies.
January 17, 2017: Alexi Amarista was signed as a free agent by the Colorado Rockies.
January 28, 2017: Greg Holland was signed as a free agent by the Colorado Rockies.
February 1, 2017: Eddie Butler was traded by the Colorado Rockies to the Chicago Cubs for James Farris (minors).
April 2, 2017: Ryan Hanigan was signed as a free agent by the Colorado Rockies.

For their pre-season spring training, the Rockies participated in the Cactus League, finishing with a 16–15 win–loss record. In addition, two of their games finished tied and are not included in the standings.

Regular season

Summary
The Rockies won their Opening Day game on April 3, defeating the Milwaukee Brewers, 7−5.  Relief pitcher Greg Holland, making his Rockies debut, earned the save, his first save since September 17, 2015.

Holland won the National League Reliever of the Month Award for April.

On Mother's Day, Holland broke the franchise record of converting 16 consecutive saves to start a season, formerly held by José Jiménez, which he had set in 2002.

For the month of May, Charlie Blackmon won his first MLB Player of the Month Award, for the National League.  He led the NL in hits (42) and triples (five), was second in batting average (.359), fourth in runs scored (24), tied for fifth in RBI (22), and tied for seventh with a 1.037 OPS.  Holland won his second consecutive NL Reliever of the Month Award, going for 20-for-20 in save opportunities, a 1.31 ERA and 0.82 WHIP through May.

On June 18, 2017, Nolan Arenado hit for the cycle versus the San Francisco Giants.  The home run was a walk off, securing a 7−5 win off Giants closer Mark Melancon.  The 288th cycle in MLB history, it was the eighth by a Rockies player, and the 17th overall accomplished at Coors Field.  It was only the sixth time in MLB history that a cycle included a walk-off home run; Carlos González did the same on July 31, 2010, versus the Chicago Cubs.

During the June 28 game versus the Giants, Arenado knocked down a line drive batted by pitcher Ty Blach as he was facing third base, spun on his stomach, and, without getting up on his feet, threw out Blach at first base.

Arenado set career-highs with three home runs and five hits, while tying a career-high seven RBI in an 18–4 rout of the San Diego Padres on July 19. He tied the franchise record held by Jeff Cirillo and Todd Walker for the number of total bases in a single game with 14, and became the first player in Rockies history to reach both three home runs and five hits in a single game.  He also became the first player in the majors to reach 80 RBI.  Named NL Player of the Week for the fourth time of his career on July 23, Arenado hit .458/.480/1.000 with four home runs and 13 RBI in five games.  He later won NL Player of the Month Award for July, his second career monthly award, after hitting .389/.423/.744 with eight home runs, 35 hits, 15 extra base hits, 30 RBIs and 18 runs scored in 22 games.

With a two-run home run versus José Ureña of the Miami Marlins on August 11, Arenado became the first major leaguer of 2017 to reach 100 RBI, doing so in 112 games.  He had batted .441 and 77 RBI with runners in scoring position (RISP).

On September 16 versus the Padres, Arenado drove in his 125th run of the season, becoming the first third baseman and first Rockies player to do so in three consecutive seasons.  Later that September, he became the 11th player in major league history to drive in 130 or more runs in three successive seasons.  Writing for The Sporting News, Joe Rivera noted that per Fangraphs Arenado was the fourth player in history to net at least 100 defensive runs saved within his first five seasons (103).

On September 29, 2017, Blackmon homered versus Hyun-Jin Ryu of the Los Angeles Dodgers to reach 102 RBI, surpassing Darin Erstad in 2000 for the major league record of RBI by a leadoff hitter in one season.

Season standings

National League West

National League Wild Card

Record vs. opponents

Transactions
April 5, 2017: Jason Motte was released by the Colorado Rockies.
July 5, 2017: Chad Qualls was released by the Colorado Rockies.
July 26, 2017: Pat Neshek was traded by the Philadelphia Phillies to the Colorado Rockies for Jose Gomez (minors), J.D. Hammer (minors), and Alejenadro Requena (minors).
July 30, 2017: Jonathan Lucroy was traded by the Texas Rangers to the Colorado Rockies for a player to be named later.  The Colorado Rockies sent Pedro Gonzalez (minors) (August 23, 2017) to the Texas Rangers to complete the trade.
August 1, 2017: Jordan Lyles was released by the Colorado Rockies.

Major League Debuts
Batters
Mike Tauchman (Jun 27)
Ryan McMahon (Aug 12)
Pitchers
Antonio Senzatela (Apr 6)
Kyle Freeland (Apr 7)
Shane Carle (Apr 14)

Roster

Game log 

|-  bgcolor="ffbbbb"
|- align="center" bgcolor="bbffbb"
| 1 || April 3 || @ Brewers || 7–5 || Estévez (1–0) || Mariñez (0–1) || Holland (1) || 43,336 || 1–0 || W1
|- align="center" bgcolor="bbffbb"
| 2 || April 4 || @ Brewers || 6–5 || Anderson (1–0) || Davies (0–1) || Holland (2) || 21,458 || 2–0 || W2
|- align="center" bgcolor="ffbbbb"
| 3 || April 5 || @ Brewers || 6–1 || Peralta (1–0) || Chatwood (0–1) || Feliz (1) || 21,824 || 2–1 || L1
|- align="center" bgcolor="bbffbb"
| 4 || April 6 || @ Brewers || 2–1 || Dunn (1–0) || Feliz (0–1) || Holland (3) || 23,828 || 3–1 || W1
|- align="center" bgcolor="bbffbb"
| 5 || April 7 || Dodgers || 2–1 || Freeland (1–0) || Ryu (0–1) || McGee (1) || 49,169 || 4–1 || W2
|- align="center" bgcolor="bbffbb"
| 6 || April 8 || Dodgers || 4–2 || Dunn (2–0) || Kershaw (1–1) || Holland (4) || 48,012 || 5–1 || W3
|- align="center" bgcolor="ffbbbb"
| 7 || April 9 || Dodgers || 10–6 || Maeda (1–1) || Anderson (1–1) || || 33,529 || 5–2 || L1
|- align="center" bgcolor="ffbbbb"
| 8 || April 10 || Padres || 5–3 || Díaz (1–0) || Chatwood (0–2) || || 20,504 || 5–3 || L2
|- align="center" bgcolor="bbffbb"
| 9 || April 11 || Padres || 3–2 || Senzatela (1–0) || Díaz (1–1) || Holland (5) || 20,664 || 6–3 || W1
|- align="center" bgcolor="ffbbbb"
| 10 || April 12 || Padres || 6–0 || Lee (1–0) || Freeland (1–1) ||  || 20,968 || 6–4 || L1
|- align="center" bgcolor="bbffbb"
| 11 || April 13 || @ Giants || 3–1 || Rusin (1–0) || Bumgarner (0–2) || Holland (6) || 41,915 || 7–4 || W1
|- align="center" bgcolor="ffbbbb"
| 12 || April 14 || @ Giants || 8–2 || Cueto (3–0) || Anderson (1–2) ||  || 42,738 || 7–5 || L1
|- align="center" bgcolor="bbffbb"
| 13 || April 15 || @ Giants || 5–0 || Chatwood (1–2) || Moore (1–2) ||  || 42,371 || 8–5 || W1
|- align="center" bgcolor="bbffbb"
| 14 || April 16 || @ Giants || 4–3 || Senzatela (2–0) || Samardzija (0–3) || Holland (7) || 41,455 || 9–5 || W2
|- align="center" bgcolor="bbffbb"
| 15 || April 18 || @ Dodgers || 4–3 || Rusin (2–0) || Ryu (0–3) || Holland (8) || 37,960 || 10–5 || W3
|- align="center" bgcolor="ffbbbb"
| 16 || April 19 || @ Dodgers || 4–2 || Kershaw (3–1) || Anderson (1–3) || Jansen (4) || 45,474 || 10–6 || L1
|- align="center" bgcolor="bbffbb"
| 17 || April 21 || Giants || 6–5 || Chatwood (2–2) || Cueto (3–1) || Holland (9) || 27,663 || 11–6 || W1
|- align="center" bgcolor="bbffbb"
| 18 || April 22 || Giants || 12–3 || Senzatela (3–0) || Moore (1–3) || || 39,239 || 12–6 || W2
|- align="center" bgcolor="bbffbb"
| 19 || April 23 || Giants || 8–0 || Freeland (2–1) || Samardzija (0–4) ||  || 42,011 || 13–6 || W3
|- align="center" bgcolor="bbffbb"
| 20 || April 24 || Nationals || 8–4 || Estévez (2–0) || Romero (1–1) || || 23,019 || 14–6 || W4
|- align="center" bgcolor="ffbbbb"
| 21 || April 25 || Nationals || 15–12 || Romero (2–1) || Márquez (0–1) || || 21,340 || 14–7 || L1
|- align="center" bgcolor="ffbbbb"
| 22 || April 26 || Nationals || 11–4 || Roark (3–0) || Chatwood (2–3) || || 22,461 || 14–8 || L2
|- align="center" bgcolor="ffbbbb"
| 23 || April 27 || Nationals || 16–5 || González (3–0) || Senzatela (3–1) || || 34,929 || 14–9 || L3
|- align="center" bgcolor="bbffbb"
| 24 || April 28 || @ Diamondbacks || 3–1 || Freeland (3–1) || Ray (2–1) || Holland (10) || 19,300 || 15–9 || W1
|- align="center" bgcolor="bbffbb"
| 25 || April 29 || @ Diamondbacks || 7–6 || Estévez (3–0) || Rodney (1–2) || Holland (11) || 30,445 || 16–9 || W2
|- align="center" bgcolor="ffbbbb"
| 26 || April 30 || @ Diamondbacks || 2–0 (13) || Delgado (1–0) || Lyles (0–1) ||  || 23,613 || 16–10 || L1
|-

|-  bgcolor="ffbbbb"
|- align="center" bgcolor="ffbbbb"
| 27 || May 2 || @ Padres || 6–2 || Cahill (2–2) || Chatwood (2–4) || || 18,910 || 16–11 || L2
|- align="center" bgcolor="bbffbb"
| 28 || May 3 || @ Padres || 11–3 || Senzatela (4–1) || Weaver (0–3) || || 16,487 || 17–11 || W1
|- align="center" bgcolor="bbffbb"
| 29 || May 4 || @ Padres || 3–2 (11) || Qualls (1–0) || Hand (0–1) || Holland (12) || 16,356 || 18–11 || W2
|- align="center" bgcolor="ffbbbb"
| 30 || May 5 || Diamondbacks || 6–3 || Greinke (3–2) || Márquez (0–2) || Rodney (8) || 30,030 || 18–12 || L1
|- align="center" bgcolor="bbffbb"
| 31 || May 6 || Diamondbacks || 9–1 || Anderson (2–3) || Corbin (2–4) || Rusin (1) || 36,165 || 19–12 || W1
|- align="center" bgcolor="bbffbb"
| 32 || May 7 || Diamondbacks || 5–2 || Chatwood (3–4) || Walker (3–2) || Holland (13) || 39,175 || 20–12 || W2
|- align="center" bgcolor="bbbbbb"
| – || May 8 || Cubs || colspan=7 | Postponed (rain) Rescheduled for May 9
|- align="center" bgcolor="bbffbb"
| 33 || May 9 || Cubs || 10–4 || Senzatela (5–1) || Arrieta (4–2) || || 34,779 || 21–12 || W3
|- align="center" bgcolor="ffbbbb"
| 34 || May 9 || Cubs || 8–1 || Lackey (3–3) || Freeland (3–2) || || 36,563 || 21–13 || L1
|- align="center" bgcolor="bbffbb"
| 35 || May 10 || Cubs || 3–0 || Márquez (1–2) || Hendricks (2–2) || Holland (14) || 35,213 || 22–13 || W1
|- align="center" bgcolor="bbffbb"
| 36 || May 11 || Dodgers || 10–7 || Hoffman (1–0) || Ryu (1–5) || Holland (15) || 27,265 || 23–13 || W2
|- align="center" bgcolor="ffbbbb"
| 37 || May 12 || Dodgers || 6–2 || Kershaw (6–2) || Chatwood (3–5) || || 40,146 || 23–14 || L1
|- align="center" bgcolor="ffbbbb"
| 38 || May 13 || Dodgers || 4–0 || Wood (4–0) || Anderson (2–4) || || 43,534 || 23–15 || L2
|- align="center" bgcolor="bbffbb"
| 39 || May 14 || Dodgers || 9–6 || Senzatela (6–1) || Urías (0–1) || Holland (16) || 41,051 || 24–15 || W1
|- align="center" bgcolor="bbffbb"
| 40 || May 16 || @ Twins || 7–3 || Freeland (4–2) || Hughes (4–2) || Holland (17) || 24,295 || 25–15 || W2
|- align="center" bgcolor="bbbbbb"
| – || May 17 || @ Twins || colspan=7 | Postponed (rain) Rescheduled for May 18
|- align="center" bgcolor="bbffbb"
| 41 || May 18 || @ Twins || 5–1 || Márquez (2–2) || Santana (6–2) || Holland (18) || 20,603 || 26–15 || W3
|- align="center" bgcolor="ffbbbb"
| 42 || May 18 || @ Twins || 2–0 || Berríos (2–0) || Chatwood (3–6) || Kintzler (11) || 17,140 || 26–16 || L1
|- align="center" bgcolor="bbffbb"
| 43 || May 19 || @ Reds || 12–6 || Anderson (3–4) || Bonilla (0–2) || || 23,184 || 27–16 || W1
|- align="center" bgcolor="ffbbbb"
| 44 || May 20 || @ Reds || 12–8 || Wojciechowski (1–0) || Dunn (2–1) || || 25,188 || 27–17 || L1
|- align="center" bgcolor="bbffbb"
| 45 || May 21 || @ Reds || 6–4 || Freeland (5–2) || Arroyo (3–4) || Holland (19) || 23,352 || 28–17 || W1
|- align="center" bgcolor="bbffbb"
| 46 || May 22 || @ Phillies || 8–1 || Hoffman (2–0) || Eickhoff (0–5) || || 21,251 || 29–17 || W2
|- align="center" bgcolor="bbffbb"
| 47 || May 23 || @ Phillies || 8–2 || Márquez (3–2) || Eflin (0–2) || || 17,109 || 30–17 || W3
|- align="center" bgcolor="bbffbb"
| 48 || May 24 || @ Phillies || 7–2 || Chatwood (4–6) || Hellickson (5–2) || || 19,160 || 31–17 || W4
|- align="center" bgcolor="ffbbbb"
| 49 || May 25 || @ Phillies || 2–1 (11) || Gómez (3–1) || Oberg (0–1) || || 18,143 || 31–18 || L1
|- align="center" bgcolor="bbffbb"
| 50 || May 26 || Cardinals || 10–0 || Senzatela (7–1) || Martínez (3–4) || || 40,312 || 32–18 || W1
|- align="center" bgcolor="ffbbbb"
| 51 || May 27 || Cardinals || 3–0 || Wainwright (5–3) || Freeland (5–3) || Oh (11) || 48,106 || 32–19 || L1
|- align="center" bgcolor="bbffbb"
| 52 || May 28 || Cardinals || 8–4 || Márquez (4–2) || Lynn (4–3) || || 48,372 || 33–19 || W1
|- align="center" bgcolor="ffbbbb"
| 53 || May 29 || Mariners || 6–5 || Gaviglio (1–1) || Chatwood (4–7) || Díaz (9) || 40,298 || 33–20 || L1
|- align="center" bgcolor="ffbbbb"
| 54 || May 30 || Mariners || 10–4 || Miranda (5–2) || Anderson (3–5) || || 33,258 || 33–21 || L2
|- align="center" bgcolor="ffbbbb"
| 55 || May 31 || @ Mariners || 5–0 || Paxton (4–0) || Senzatela (7–2) || || 16,750 || 33–22 || L3
|-

|-  bgcolor="ffbbbb"
|- align="center" bgcolor="bbffbb"
| 56 || June 1 || @ Mariners || 6–3 || Freeland (6–3) || Gallardo (2–6) || Holland (20) || 21,536 || 34–22 || W1
|- align="center" bgcolor="ffbbbb"
| 57 || June 2 || @ Padres || 8–5 || Richard (4–6) || Márquez (4–3) || Maurer (9) || 20,932 || 34–23 || L1
|- align="center" bgcolor="bbffbb"
| 58 || June 3 || @ Padres || 10–1 || Chatwood (5–7) || Chacín (4–5) || || 20,996 || 35–23 || W1
|- align="center" bgcolor="bbffbb"
| 59 || June 4 || @ Padres || 3–1 || Hoffman (3–0) || Cosart (0–2) || Holland (21) || 24,763 || 36–23 || W2
|- align="center" bgcolor="bbffbb"
| 60 || June 6 || Indians || 11–3 || Senzatela (8–2) || Clevinger (2–3) || || 39,508 || 37–23 || W3
|- align="center" bgcolor="bbffbb"
| 61 || June 7 || Indians || 8–1 || Freeland (7–3) || Bauer (5–5) || || 36,909 || 38–23 || W4
|- align="center" bgcolor="bbffbb"
| 62 || June 8 || @ Cubs || 4–1 || Chatwood (6–7) || Lester (3–4) || Holland (22) || 39,385 || 39–23 || W5
|- align="center" bgcolor="bbffbb"
| 63 || June 9 || @ Cubs || 5–3 || Rusin (3–0) || Frankoff (0–1) || Holland (23) || 41,229 || 40–23 || W6
|- align="center" bgcolor="bbffbb"
| 64 || June 10 || @ Cubs || 9–1 || Hoffman (4–0) || Butler (3–2) || || 41,226 || 41–23 || W7
|- align="center" bgcolor="ffbbbb"
| 65 || June 11 || @ Cubs || 7–5 || Edwards Jr. (2–0) || Lyles (0–2) || Davis (13) || 41,116 || 41–24 || L1
|- align="center" bgcolor="ffbbbb"
| 66 || June 12 || @ Pirates || 7–2 || Taillon (3–1) || Freeland (7–4) || || 16,320 || 41–25 || L2
|- align="center" bgcolor="ffbbbb"
| 67 || June 13 || @ Pirates || 5–2 || Cole (4–6) || Ottavino (0–1) || || 16,764 || 41–26 || L3
|- align="center" bgcolor="bbffbb"
| 68 || June 14 || @ Pirates || 5–1 || Márquez (5–3) || Kuhl (1–6) || || 17,308 || 42–26 || W1
|- align="center" bgcolor="bbffbb"
| 69 || June 15 || Giants || 10–9 || Holland (1–0) || Strickland (1–2) || || 40,747 || 43–26 || W2
|- align="center" bgcolor="bbffbb"
| 70 || June 16 || Giants || 10–8 || Senzatela (9–2) || Samardzija (2–9) || Holland (24) || 46,632 || 44–26 || W3
|- align="center" bgcolor="bbffbb"
| 71 || June 17 || Giants || 5–1 || Freeland (8–4) || Cain (3–6) || || 48,035 || 45–26 || W4
|- align="center" bgcolor="bbffbb"
| 72 || June 18 || Giants || 7–5 || Estévez (4–0) || Melancon (1–2) || || 48,341 || 46–26 || W5
|- align="center" bgcolor="bbffbb"
| 73 || June 20 || Diamondbacks || 4–3 || Ottavino (1–1) || Greinke (8–4) || Holland (25) || 35,016 || 47–26 || W6
|- align="center" bgcolor="ffbbbb"
| 74 || June 21 || Diamondbacks || 16–5 || Walker (6–3) || Hoffman (4–1) || || 40,918 || 47–27 || L1
|- align="center" bgcolor="ffbbbb"
| 75 || June 22 || Diamondbacks || 10–3 || Godley (3–1) || Senzatela (9–3) || || 40,681 || 47–28 || L2
|- align="center" bgcolor="ffbbbb"
| 76 || June 23 || @ Dodgers || 6–1 || Wood (8–0) || Freeland (8–5) || || 43.787 || 47–29 || L3
|- align="center" bgcolor="ffbbbb"
| 77 || June 24 || @ Dodgers || 4–0 || Kershaw (11–2) || Chatwood (6–8) || || 50,403 || 47–30 || L4
|- align="center" bgcolor="ffbbbb"
| 78 || June 25 || @ Dodgers || 12–6 || Báez (2–0)  || Ottavino (1–2)  ||  Jansen (17) || 41,605 || 47–31 || L5
|- align="center" bgcolor="ffbbbb"
| 79 || June 26 || @ Giants || 9–2 || Samardzija (3–9) || Márquez (5–4) || || 41,388 || 47–32 || L6
|- align="center" bgcolor="ffbbbb"
| 80 || June 27 || @ Giants || 4–3 (14) || Gearrin (2–2) || Qualls (1–1) || || 41,331 || 47–33 || L7
|- align="center" bgcolor="ffbbbb"
| 81 || June 28 || @ Giants || 5–3 || Blach (5–5) || Freeland (8–6) || Strickland (1) || 41,286 || 47–34 || L8
|- align="center" bgcolor="bbffbb"
| 82 || June 30 || @ Diamondbacks || 6–3 || Gray (1–0) || Ray (8–4) || Holland (26) || 23,275 || 48–34 || W1
|-

|-  bgcolor="ffbbbb"
|- align="center" bgcolor=ffbbbb
| 83 || July 1 || @ Diamondbacks|| 6–2 || Greinke (10–4) || Chatwood (6–9) || || 46,338 || 48–35 || L1 
|- align="center" bgcolor=ffbbbb
| 84 || July 2 || @ Diamondbacks || 4–3 || Rodney (3–2) || Ottavino (1–3) || || 34,556 || 48–36 || L2
|- align="center" bgcolor="bbffbb"
| 85 || July 3 || Reds || 5–3 || Hoffman (5–1) || Castillo (0–1) || Holland (27) || 49,131 || 49–36 || W1
|- align="center" bgcolor="ffbbbb"
| 86 || July 4 || Reds || 8–1 || Bailey (1–2) || Freeland (8–7) || || 48,338 || 49–37 || L1
|- align="center" bgcolor="bbffbb"
| 87 || July 5 || Reds || 5–3 || Gray (2–0) || Feldman (7–6) || Holland (28) || 32,188 || 50–37 || W1
|- align="center" bgcolor="ffbbbb"
| 88 || July 6 || Reds || 6–3 || Romano (1–1) || Chatwood (6–10) || || 27,328 || 50–38 || L1
|- align="center" bgcolor="bbffbb"
| 89 || July 7 || White Sox || 12–4 || Márquez (6–4) || Holland (5–9) || || 38,386 || 51–38 || W1
|- align="center" bgcolor="ffbbbb"
| 90 || July 8 || White Sox || 5–4 || Kahnle (1–3) || Holland (1–1) || Robertson (13) || 48,118 || 51–39 || L1
|- align="center" bgcolor="bbffbb"
| 91 || July 9 || White Sox || 10–0 || Freeland (9–7) || Rodon (1–2) || || 36,541 || 52–39 || W1
|-style="text-align:center; background:#bbcaff;"
|colspan="10"|88th All-Star Game in Miami, Florida
|- align="center" bgcolor="ffbbbb"
| 92 || July 14 || @ Mets || 14–2 || deGrom (10–3) || Gray (2–1) || || 27,582 || 52–40 || L1
|- align="center" bgcolor="ffbbbb"
| 93 || July 15 || @ Mets || 9–3 || Lugo (4–2) || Chatwood (6–11) || || 34,783 || 52–41 || L2
|- align="center" bgcolor="bbffbb"
| 94 || July 16 || @ Mets || 13–4 || Hoffman (6–1) || Matz (2–3) || || 28,745 || 53–41 || W1
|- align="center" bgcolor="bbffbb"
| 95 || July 17 || Padres || 9–6 || Márquez (7–4) || Perdomo (4–5) || Holland (29) || 37,561 || 54–41 || W2
|- align="center" bgcolor="bbffbb"
| 96 || July 18 || Padres || 9–7 || Senzatela (10–3) || Lamet (3–4) || Holland (30) || 40,101 || 55–41 || W3
|- align="center" bgcolor="bbffbb"
| 97 || July 19 || Padres || 18–4 || Gray (3–1) || Richard (5–10) || || 37,128 || 56–41 || W4
|- align="center" bgcolor="ffbbbb"
| 98 || July 21 || Pirates || 13–5 || Williams (4–4) || Hoffman (6–2) || || 41,192 || 56–42 || L1
|- align="center" bgcolor="bbffbb"
| 99 || July 22 || Pirates || 7–3 || Márquez (8–4) || Kuhl (3–7) || Holland (31) || 48,235 || 57–42 || W1
|- align="center" bgcolor="bbffbb"
| 100 || July 23 || Pirates || 13–3 || Freeland (10–7) || Nova (10–7) || || 40,118 || 58–42 || W2
|- align="center" bgcolor="ffbbbb"
| 101 || July 24 || @ Cardinals || 8–2 || Leake (7–8) || Senzatela (10–4) || || 40,486 || 58–43 || L1
|- align="center" bgcolor="ffbbbb"
| 102 || July 25 || @ Cardinals || 3–2 || Rosenthal (3–4) || McGee (0–1) || || 41,514 || 58–44 || L2
|- align="center" bgcolor="ffbbbb"
| 103 || July 26 || @ Cardinals || 10–5 || Martinez (7–8) || Hoffman (6–3) || || 38,162 || 58–45 || L3
|- align="center" bgcolor="bbbbbb"
| — || July 28 || @ Nationals || colspan=7|Postponed (rain); Rescheduled for July 30
|- align="center" bgcolor="bbffbb"
| 104 || July 29 || @ Nationals || 4–2 || Márquez (9–4) || Roark (8–7) || Holland (32) || 33,989 || 59–45 || W1
|- align="center" bgcolor="bbffbb"
| 105 || July 30 || @ Nationals || 10–6 || Freeland (11–7) || Fedde (0–1) || Holland (33) || 33,248 || 60–45 || W2
|- align="center" bgcolor="ffbbbb"
| 106 || July 30 || @ Nationals|| 3–1 || Jackson (2–1) || Gray (3–2) || Doolittle (6) || 31,118 || 60–46 || L1
|-

|-  bgcolor="ffbbbb"
|- align="center" bgcolor="bbffbb"
| 107 || August 1 || Mets || 5–4 || Dunn (3–1) || Robles (6–2) || || 36,698 || 61–46 || W1
|- align="center" bgcolor="ffbbbb"
| 108 || August 2 || Mets || 10–5 || Bradford (1–0) || Chatwood (6–12) || || 36,945 || 61–47 || L1
|- align="center" bgcolor="bbffbb"
| 109 || August 3 || Mets || 5–4 || Holland (2–1) || Robles (6–3) || || 35,276 || 62–47 || W1
|- align="center" bgcolor="bbffbb"
| 110 || August 4 || Phillies || 4–3 || Dunn (4–1) || García (1–3) || Holland (34) || 35,092 || 63–47 || W2
|- align="center" bgcolor="bbffbb"
| 111 || August 5 || Phillies || 8–5 || Gray (4–2) || Pivetta (4–7) || || 40,563 || 64–47 || W3
|- align="center" bgcolor="ffbbbb"
| 112 || August 6 || Phillies || 3–2 || Ramos (1–7) || Holland (2–2) || Neris (11) || 48,069 || 64–48 || L1
|- align="center" bgcolor="ffbbbb"
| 113 || August 8 || @ Indians || 4–1 || Kluber (10–3) || Holland (2–3) || — || 26,088 || 64–49 || L2
|- align="center" bgcolor="bbffbb"
| 114 || August 9 || @ Indians || 3–2 (12) || Estévez (5–0) || McAllister (1–2) || Chatwood (1) || 25,539 || 65–49 || W1
|- align="center" bgcolor="ffbbbb"
| 115 || August 11 || @ Marlins || 6–3 || Tazawa (2–2) || McGee (0–2) || Ziegler (3) || 20,096 || 65–50 || L1
|- align="center" bgcolor="ffbbbb"
| 116 || August 12 || @ Marlins || 4–3 || Nicolino (1–1) || Hoffman (6–4) || Ziegler (4) || 20,399 || 65–51 || L2
|- align="center" bgcolor="ffbbbb"
| 117 || August 13 || @ Marlins || 5–3 || Guerra (1–0) || Márquez (9–5) || Despaigne (1) || 20,769 || 65–52 || L3
|- align="center" bgcolor="bbffbb"
| 118 || August 14 || Braves || 3–0 || Dunn (5–1) || Brothers (2–3) || Holland (35) || 33,641 || 66–52 || W1
|- align="center" bgcolor="ffbbbb"
| 119 || August 15 || Braves || 4–3 || Freeman (2–0) || Neshek (3–3) || Vizcaíno (7) || 28,655 || 66–53 || L1
|- align="center" bgcolor="bbffbb"
| 120 || August 16 || Braves || 17–2 || Gray (5–2) || Foltynewicz (10–8) || — || 30,695 || 67–53 || W1
|- align="center" bgcolor="ffbbbb"
| 121 || August 17 || Braves || 10–4 || Sims (1–3) || Hoffman (6–5) || — || 30,020 || 67–54 || L1
|- align="center" bgcolor="bbffbb"
| 122 || August 18 || Brewers || 8–4 || Marquez (10–5) || Garza (6–7) || — || 32,385 || 68–54 || W1
|- align="center" bgcolor="ffbbbb"
| 123 || August 19 || Brewers || 6–3 || Swarzak (6–3) || Holland (2–4) || Knebel (25) || 47,216 || 68–55 || L1
|- align="center" bgcolor="ffbbbb"
| 124 || August 20 || Brewers || 8–4 || Anderson (7–2) || Freeland (11–8) || Knebel (26) || 32,426 || 68–56 || L2 
|- align="center" bgcolor="ffbbbb"
| 125 || August 22 || @ Royals || 3–2 || Duffy (8–8) || Gray (5–3) || Alexander (1) || 22,868 || 68–57 || L3
|- align="center" bgcolor="ffbbbb"
| 126 || August 23 || @ Royals || 6–4 || Maurer (3–5) || Holland (2–5) || — || 25,752 || 68–58 || L4
|- align="center" bgcolor="bbffbb"
| 127 || August 24 || @ Royals || 3–2 || Ottavino (2–3) || Minor (5–6) || Holland (36) || 25,314 || 69–58 || W1
|- align="center" bgcolor="ffbbbb"
| 128 || August 25 || @ Braves || 2–5 || Teherán (8–11) || Bettis (0–1) || Vizcaíno (8) || 33,577 || 69–59 || L1
|- align="center" bgcolor="bbffbb"
| 129 || August 26 || @ Braves || 7–6 || Neshek (4–3) || Vizcaíno (3–3) || McGee (2) || 32,448 || 70–59 || W1
|- align="center" bgcolor="bbffbb"
| 130 || August 27 || @ Braves || 3–0 || Gray (6–3) || Foltynewicz (10–10) || McGee (3) || 28,154 || 71–59 || W2
|- align="center" bgcolor="ffbbbb"
| 131 || August 28 || Tigers || 4–3 || Zimmermann (8–11) || Senzatela (10–5) || Greene (6) || 30,754 || 71–60 || L1
|- align="center" bgcolor="bbffbb"
| 132 || August 29 || Tigers || 7–3 || Neshek (5–3) || Fulmer (10–12) || — || 30,721 || 72–60 || W1
|- align="center" bgcolor="ffbbbb"
| 133 || August 30 || Tigers || 2–6 || Verlander (10–8) || Bettis (0–2) || — || 29,281 || 72–61 || L1
|-

|-  bgcolor="ffbbbb"
|- align="center" bgcolor="ffbbbb"
| 134 || September 1 || Diamondbacks || 9–5 || Walker (8–7) || Freeland (11–9) || — || 29,628 || 72–62 || L2
|- align="center" bgcolor="ffbbbb"
| 135 || September 2 || Diamondbacks || 6–2 || Corbin (13–11) || Gray (6–4) || — || 39,442 || 72–63 || L3
|- align="center" bgcolor="ffbbbb"
| 136 || September 3 || Diamondbacks || 5–1 || Godley (7–7) || Marquez (10–6) || Sherfy (1) || 33,838 || 72–64 || L4
|- align="center" bgcolor="bbffbb"
| 137 || September 4 || Giants || 4–3 || Holland (3–5) || Okert (1–1) || — || 28,300 || 73–64 || W1
|- align="center" bgcolor="bbffbb"
| 138 || September 5 || Giants || 9–6 || Rusin (4–0) || Blach (8–12) || Holland (37) || 24,245 || 74–64 || W2
|- align="center" bgcolor="ffbbbb"
| 139 || September 6 || Giants || 11–3 || Cueto (7–7) || Freeland (11–10) || — || 26,674 || 74–65 || L1
|- align="center" bgcolor="bbffbb"
| 140 || September 7 || @ Dodgers || 9–1 || Gray (7–4) || Kershaw (16–3) || — || 51,492|| 75–65 || W1
|- align="center" bgcolor="bbffbb"
| 141 || September 8 || @ Dodgers || 5–4 || Rusin (5–0) || Darvish (8–12) || Holland (38) || 53,632 || 76–65 || W2
|- align="center" bgcolor="bbffbb"
| 142 || September 9 || @ Dodgers || 6–5 || Bettis (1–2) || Wood (14–3) || Holland (39) || 52,884 || 77–65 || W3
|- align="center" bgcolor="bbffbb"
| 143 || September 10 || @ Dodgers || 8–1 || Chatwood (7–12) || Hill (9–8) || — || 50,161 || 78–65 || W4
|- align="center" bgcolor="bbffbb"
| 144 || September 11 || @ Diamondbacks || 5–4 || Anderson (4–5) || Barrett (1–1) || Holland (40) || 24,178 || 79–65 || W5
|- align="center" bgcolor="bbffbb"
| 145 || September 12 || @ Diamondbacks || 4–2 || Gray (8–4) || Hernandez (3–1) || Rusin (2) || 27,526 || 80–65 || W6
|- align="center" bgcolor="ffbbbb"
| 146 || September 13 || @ Diamondbacks || 8–1 || Corbin (14–12) || Marquez (10–7) || — || 26,714 || 80–66 || L1
|- align="center" bgcolor="ffbbbb"
| 147 || September 14 || @ Diamondbacks || 7–0 || Godley (8–7) || Bettis (1–3) || — || 20,317 || 80–67 || L2
|- align="center" bgcolor="bbffbb"
| 148 || September 15 || Padres || 6–1 || Chatwood (8–12) || Richard (7–14) || — || 39,243 || 81–67 || W1
|- align="center" bgcolor="bbffbb"
| 149 || September 16 || Padres || 16–0 || Anderson (5–5) || Lyles (1–3) || — || 48,247 || 82–67 || W2
|- align="center" bgcolor="ffbbbb"
| 150 || September 17 || Padres || 4–3 || Yates (4–5) || Holland (3–6) || — || 34,634 || 82–68 || L1
|- align="center" bgcolor="ffbbbb"
| 151 || September 19 || @ Giants || 4–3 || Dyson (4–8) || Rusin (5–1)|| — || 40,686 || 82–69 ||L2
|- align="center" bgcolor="ffbbbb"
| 152 || September 20 || @ Giants || 4–0 || Moore (6–14) || Chatwood (8–13) || — || 39,775 || 82–70 ||L3
|- align="center" bgcolor="ffbbbb"
| 153 || September 21 || @ Padres || 3–0 || Richard (8–14) || Anderson (5–6) || Hand (20) || 30,944 || 82–71 || L4
|- align="center" bgcolor="bbffbb"
| 154 || September 22 || @ Padres || 4–1 || Gray (9–4) || Lyles (1–4) || Holland (41) || 25,273 || 83–71 || W1
|- align="center" bgcolor="ffbbbb"
| 155 || September 23 || @ Padres || 5–0 || Chacín (13–10) || Bettis (1–4) || — || 33,899 || 83–72 || L1
|- align="center" bgcolor="bbffbb"
| 156 || September 24 || @ Padres || 8–4 || Márquez (11–7) || Perdomo (8–11) || — || 28,339 || 84–72 || W1
|- align="center" bgcolor="ffbbbb"
| 157 || September 25 || Marlins || 5–4 || Despaigne (1–3) || Chatwood (8–14) || Barraclough (1) || 24,685 || 84–73 || L1
|- align="center" bgcolor="bbffbb"
| 158 || September 26 || Marlins || 6–0 || Anderson (6–6) || Urena (14–7) || — || 30,409 || 85–73 || W1
|- align="center" bgcolor="bbffbb"
| 159 || September 27 || Marlins || 15–9 || Gray (10–4) || Conley (7–8) || — || 27,497 || 86–73 || W2
|- align="center" bgcolor="bbffbb"
| 160 || September 29 || Dodgers || 9–1 || Bettis (2–4) || Ryu (5–9) || — || 48,395 || 87–73 || W3
|- align="center" bgcolor="ffbbbb"
| 161 || September 30 || Dodgers || 5–3 || Morrow (6–0) || Chatwood (8–15) || Jansen (41) ||48,103 || 87–74 || L1
|- align="center" bgcolor="ffbbbb"
| 162 || October 1 || Dodgers || 3–6 || Maeda (13–6) || Freeland (11–11) || Fields (2) || 32,946 || 87–75 || L2
|-

|- style="text-align:center;"
| Legend:       = Win       = Loss       = PostponementBold = Rockies team member

Postseason

Game Log

|- align="center" bgcolor="ffbbbb"
| 1 || October 4 || @ Diamondbacks || 8–11 || Chafin (1–0) || Gray (0–1) || || 48,803 || 0–1
|-

Postseason rosters

| style="text-align:left" |
Pitchers: 37 Pat Neshek 38 Mike Dunn 44 Tyler Anderson 45 Scott Oberg 49 Antonio Senzatela 51 Jake McGee 52 Chris Rusin 54 Carlos Estévez 55 Jon Gray 56 Greg Holland  
Catchers: 14 Tony Wolters 21 Jonathan Lucroy 30 Ryan Hanigan 
Infielders: 2 Alexi Amarista 4 Pat Valaika 9 DJ LeMahieu 12 Mark Reynolds 27 Trevor Story 28 Nolan Arenado
Outfielders: 3 Mike Tauchman 5 Carlos González 7 Raimel Tapia 8 Gerardo Parra 19 Charlie Blackmon 20 Ian Desmond  
|- valign="top"

Player stats

Batting

Starters by position 
Note: Pos = Position; G = Games played; AB = At bats; H = Hits; Avg. = Batting average; HR = Home runs; RBI = Runs batted in

Other batters 
Note: G = Games played; AB = At bats; H = Hits; Avg. = Batting average; HR = Home runs; RBI = Runs batted in

Pitching

Starting pitchers 
Note: G = Games pitched; IP = Innings pitched; W = Wins; L = Losses; ERA = Earned run average; SO = Strikeouts

Other pitchers 
Note: G = Games pitched; IP = Innings pitched; W = Wins; L = Losses; ERA = Earned run average; SO = Strikeouts

Relief pitchers 
Note: G = Games pitched; W = Wins; L = Losses; SV = Saves; ERA = Earned run average; SO = Strikeouts

Awards and league leaders

Awards
 Fielding Bible Awards:
 Nolan Arenado (3B)
 DJ LeMahieu (2B)
 National League All-Stars:
 Nolan Arenado (3B—starter)
 Charlie Blackmon (CF—starter)
 Greg Holland (RHP) 
 DJ LeMahieu (2B)
 National League Player of the Month Awards:
 May:  Charlie Blackmon
 July:  Nolan Arenado
 Players Choice for Majestic Athletic Always Game Award:  Nolan Arenado
 Rawlings Gold Glove Awards:
 Nolan Arenado (3B)
 DJ LeMahieu (2B)
 Rawlings Platinum Glove Award for the National League:  Nolan Arenado
 Silver Slugger Awards:
 Nolan Arenado (3B)
 Charlie Blackmon (CF)

National League leaders

Batting statistics
 Batting champion: Charlie Blackmon
 Doubles leader:  Nolan Arenado
 Hits leader:  Charlie Blackmon
 Runs scored leader:  Charlie Blackmon
 Strikeouts leader:  Trevor Story
 Triples leader:  Charlie Blackmon
 Total bases leader:  Charlie Blackmon
 Ref:

Farm system

See also

 List of Major League Baseball players to hit for the cycle

Notes

References

External links
2017 Colorado Rockies at Baseball Reference
2017 Colorado Rockies season Official Site

Colorado Rockies seasons
Colorado Rockies
Colorado Rockies
2010s in Denver